Edgewood is a city in Orange County, Florida, United States. The population was 2,503 at the 2010 census. It is part of the Orlando–Kissimmee–Sanford Metropolitan Statistical Area.

Geography

Demographics

At the 2000 census there were 1,901 people in 798 households, including 549 families, in the city. The racial makeup of the city was 89.69% White, 4.63% African American, 0.37% Native American, 2.26% Asian, 1.32% from other races, and 1.74% from two or more races. Hispanic or Latino of any race were 7.63%.

Of the 798 households 24.4% had children under the age of 18 living with them, 60.2% were married couples living together, 6.3% had a female householder with no husband present, and 31.1% were non-families. 25.9% of households were one person and 8.9% were one person aged 65 or older. The average household size was 2.35 and the average family size was 2.80.

The age distribution was 20.4% under the age of 18, 4.7% from 18 to 24, 30.0% from 25 to 44, 28.0% from 45 to 64, and 16.8% 65 or older. The median age was 42 years. For every 100 females, there were 96.8 males. For every 100 females age 18 and over, there were 96.7 males.

The median household income was $56,528 and the median family income  was $68,977. Males had a median income of $39,250 versus $30,263 for females. The per capita income for the city was $33,452. About 2.9% of families and 6.2% of the population were below the poverty line, including 4.7% of those under age 18 and 5.8% of those age 65 or over.

In 2010 Edgewood had a population of 2,503.  The racial and ethnic makeup of the population was 69.8% non-Hispanic white, 10.6% black or African American, 0.2% Native American, 1.9% Vietnamese, 0.8% Asian Indian, 1.7% other Asian, 0.3% non-Hispanic reporting some other race, 2.7% reporting two or more races and 13.4% Hispanic or Latino.

References

External links
 City of Edgewood official website

Cities in Orange County, Florida
Greater Orlando
Cities in Florida